The 2009 Vojko Herksel Cup was the 4th Vojko Herksel Cup. Hold of Final tournament is Gospić. Winner of the four edition of the Šibenik Jolly who won Gospić Croatia Osiguranje. Vojko Herksel Cup was also the traditional Gospić Cup, which was the sixth time in a row.

Final tournament

References

Vojko Herksel Cup
2009–10 in European women's basketball
2009–10 in Montenegrin basketball
2009–10 in Croatian basketball
2009–10 in Slovenian basketball